Cabrillo may refer to:

People
 Juan Rodríguez Cabrillo, the first European to explore California.

Places, buildings and structures
 Cabrillo Beach, a section of San Pedro, California near Point Fermin
 Cabrillo Bridge, San Diego, California 
 Cabrillo Freeway, the official name of California State Route 163
Cabrillo Highway, various segments of California State Route 1
 Cabrillo Marine Museum, San Pedro, California
 Cabrillo National Monument, San Diego, California
 Point Cabrillo Light, a peninsula and lighthouse in Mendocino County, northern California

Schools
 Cabrillo College in Aptos, California
 Cabrillo High School (Lompoc, California)
 Cabrillo High School (Long Beach, California)
 Cabrillo Middle School in Santa Clara, California
 Cabrillo Middle School in Ventura, California

Other
 SS Cabrillo, a wooden steamship